Iranian Jews in Israel refers to the community of Iranian Jews who immigrated to Ottoman Palestine, Mandate Palestine, and later the State of Israel. Iranian Jews in Israel number over 135,000 and most of them are Israeli born.

History

The first Persian Jews to settle in Ottoman Palestine were from Shiraz. They left in 1815 in a caravan, making their way to the port of Bushehr and from there boarded a ship to Basra in southern Iraq. 
From there, they traveled by land to Baghdad and Damascus. Those who survived the difficult journey settled in Tzfat and Jerusalem, establishing the nucleus of the Iranian Jewish community in these cities.

After the establishment of the State of Israel, immigration increased significantly. In 1952 under the Israeli mission, Operation Cyrus, approximately 30,000 Iranian Jews immigrated to Israel. In addition, many Iranian Jews immigrated to Israel after the Iranian revolution in 1979. Following the 1979 Iranian Revolution an additional 10,000 to 15,000 Iranian Jews immigrated directly to Israel, many others migrated first to the United States or Europe and then to Israel, mainly out of fear of the new Ayatollahs regime but also from lack of familiarity with Israel (Israel, in Iran, was seen as a country of infidels and atheists, a terrible thing to be in the Middle East; while most of the Iranian Jews are religious or traditionalists). Since the establishment of the State of Israel in 1948, over 134,000 Iranians have settled in Israel. Some fled after Habib Elghanian was murdered after being accused of "Zionism."

In the 1950s the Israeli treatment of Iranian Jews was similar to the Israeli treatment of other Jews from the Middle Eastern and North African region.

Israel continues to encourage the remaining Jews in Iran (less than 9,000) to immigrate since Israel sees the Jews of Iran as hostages of the Iranian regime, against Israel. In 2007 Israel offered monetary incentives to Jews in Iran to encourage Iranian Jewish immigration to Israel. Jews of Iranian descent in Israel are considered part of the Mizrahim.

Kol Israel transmits daily radio broadcasts to Iran in the Persian language and Menashe Amir, an Iranian Jew, hosts a talk show that draws callers from Iran.

Notable Israelis of Iranian descent

Joel Simkhai - founder of Grindr
David Rokni - Israeli colonel
Eliezer Avtabi - Israeli politician
Yossi Avni-Levy - Israeli ambassador, diplomat 
Galit Distel-Atbaryan - Israeli politician, writer
Nitsana Darshan-Leitner - Israeli attorney
Sharon Roffe Ofir - Israeli journalist, politician
Eli Avivi - founder of the micronation Akhzivland
Menashe Amir – Broadcaster in the Persian-language Kol Israel radio
Yigal Sebty - Iranian books Writer/Translator & Broadcaster in the Persian-language Kol Israel radio - retired in 2014
Orly (Fernos) Rem - Broadcaster and Director of the Persian-language Kol Israel radio
Sima Bachar – Mrs. Israel 2005
Michael Ben-Ari – Israeli politician and current member of the Knesset
Dan Halutz – Former chief of Staff of the Israel Defense Forces
Mor Karbasi – Singer
Moshe Katsav – Former President of Israel
Rita Kleinstein – Israeli pop singer
Shaul Mofaz – Former IDF Chief of Staff and Israeli Minister of Transport. Had been elected the chairman of the Kadima. 
Mordechai Zar – Israeli politician and former member of the Knesset
Ramtin Sebty– Head of the IDF's nonconventional weapons defensive alignment
Zion Evrony– Israel's ambassador to the Vatican and former ambassador to Ireland
Yosef Shiloach–  Israeli comedy actor
Lior Eliyahu - Israeli professional basketball player
Ofir Davidzada - Israeli football player 
Liraz Charhi– Israeli actress, singer
Moussa B. H. Youdim-Professor Emeritus, Winner of Israel Prize for Life Science.

See also
 History of the Jews in Iran
 Jewish ethnic divisions
 Iran–Israel relations

References

External links
Iran's Jews
Documentary about Iranian Israelis

Israeli Jews by national origin
 
Iran–Israel relations
 
 
Expulsions of Jews